Binsey is a village by the River Thames about  northwest of the centre of Oxford.

History
Binsey's most noted feature is the parish church of St Margaret, set at some distance north of the surviving houses. It dates from the 12th century and is a Grade I Listed Building. Its fame lies mostly in that just outside its west end and belltower stands St Margaret's Well, a Grade II Listed Building, which is the model for Lewis Carroll’s ‘Treacle Well’ from Alice's Adventures in Wonderland; this is a holy well dedicated to St Frideswide, patron saint of Oxford. According to legend, she fled to Binsey in a bid to escape marriage to a king of Mercia, whose pursuit of her was halted when he was struck blind at the gates of Oxford. Frideswide's prayers brought forth a healing spring, whose waters cured his blindness, and the spring was walled into a shallow well which became a focus for pilgrimage, the mediaeval sense of the word ‘treacle’ meaning ‘healing unguent’. The well became a pilgrimage site in mediaeval times.

The reason for the apparent separation of church and village is revealed best from the air; cropmarks show the floor-plans of houses that lay along the straight road that runs between them, suggesting a much larger village during the mediaeval period, or possibly one that has ‘migrated’ south.

The village and its associated farmland belonged to St Frideswide's Priory during the 14th and 15th centuries, until the priory's dissolution and (apparently) incorporation into Christ Church, a college of Oxford University, which now owns all of the buildings in Binsey, save one. Plans in 2001 by Christ Church to double the size of the village by demolishing a barn and constructing seven new residences were met with worldwide protests, leading to withdrawal of the proposal.

Binsey features a total of nine listed buildings. As well as St Margaret's Church and St Margaret's Well, Binsey has seven other listed buildings:
 Medley Manor Farmhouse
 Manor Farm Cottage
 Manor Farm House
 The Limes (known locally as ‘Great Leys’)
 Barn at Manor Farm
 The Thatched Cottage
Perch Inn

An avenue of poplars in Binsey was made famous by Gerard Manley Hopkins in his poem ‘Binsey Poplars’, written when he found the riverside trees felled. The replacements for these trees, which stretch from Binsey to Godstow, lasted until 2004, when the present replantings began.

Gallery

References

Sources

External links

Villages in Oxfordshire
Areas of Oxford
Populated places on the River Thames